Rubina Dilaik (born 26 August 1989) is an Indian actress who primarily works in Hindi television along with Hindi films. She is best known for portraying Radhika Shastri in the popular show Chotti Bahu and Soumya Singh in Shakti - Astitva Ke Ehsaas Ki. In 2020, she emerged as the winner of Bigg Boss 14.
She participated in Fear Factor: Khatron Ke Khiladi 12, where she finished at fourth place and in Jhalak Dikhhla Jaa 10, where she finished as 1st Runner-Up, both in 2022. She made her Hindi film debut with Palash Muchhal's Ardh in 2022.

Early life and work
Dilaik was born on 26 August 1989 in Shimla, Himachal Pradesh. She studied at Shimla Public School and St. Bede's College, Shimla. Her father is also a writer and has written many books in Hindi.

In her early days, she was a beauty pageant contender for which she won two local beauty pageants and was crowned Miss Shimla in 2006. She was a national-level champion in debate during her school days. She is a graduate with a degree in English Literature with minors in Political science. In 2008, she won the Miss North India Pageant held at Chandigarh.

Career

Debut and breakthrough (2008-2013)
She started her acting career from Chotti Bahu though she wanted to be an IAS and was preparing but got selected in  auditions was  held in Chandigarh. Dilaik gained recognition by playing Radhika Shastri in Zee TV's Chotti Bahu opposite Avinash Sachdev and reprising the role in the show's sequel. In 2012, she played Simran "Smiley" Gill in Sony TV's Saas Bina Sasural.

In 2013, she played Divya Jakhotia in Zee TV's Punar Vivah - Ek Nayi Umeed opposite Karan Grover.

Success and acclaim (2014-2019)

From 2013 to 2014, she portrayed Sita in Life OK's mythological show Devon Ke Dev...Mahadev and Jeannie in SAB TV's Jeannie Aur Juju.

From 2016 to 2020, Dilaik portrayed Soumya Singh in Colors TV's Shakti - Astitva Ke Ehsaas Ki opposite Vivian Dsena, for which she was awarded for Best Personality in Colors' Golden Petal Awards 2017 and Best Actress in ITA Awards 2017. In March 2021, she returned to the series. It proved as a major turning point in her career.

Bigg Boss 14 and beyond (2020-present)

In October 2020, Dilaik entered as a contestant in the fourteenth season of Bigg Boss, the Indian version of reality TV show Big Brother. She took part in the house along with her husband Abhinav Shukla. She stayed in the house for twenty weeks and emerged as the winner.

In 2022, Dilaik participated in Fear Factor: Khatron Ke Khiladi 12.

Dilaik made her Hindi film debut with Ardh in 2022 alongside Rajpal Yadav and Hiten Tejwani. It marks the directorial debut of music composer-singer Palash Muchhal. Rubina was chosen over 50 other girls during the look-test for the film. Ardh released digitally on ZEE5 on 10 June 2022 and received positive reviews from critics.

In 2022, she participated in Jhalak Dikhhla Jaa 10, where she ended up becoming the 1st runner-up.

Personal life

Dilaik had been in a relationship with her Chotti Bahu co-actor Avinash Sachdev before they split up in 2012.

Dilaik married her longtime boyfriend, actor Abhinav Shukla on 21 June 2018 in Shimla.

Dilaik revealed it on Bigg Boss 14 that her marriage with Shukla was falling apart before they entered the show. She also revealed that they had given six months to each other before getting divorced. However, post the show they decided to continue their marriage while her husband said, "there's no divorce happening".

Media image

Eastern Eye has credited Dilaik's "fast-growing fanbase", "fantastic talent and fearless approach", as a reason of her success. She is known for portraying powerful roles on-screen.

Dilaik has frequently appeared in Eastern Eyes Top 50 Sexiest Asian Women List. She ranked 26th in 2013, 11th in 2016 and 10th in 2017. Dilaik ranked 18th in 2017 and 10th in 2020, in Times 20 Most Desirable Women on TV List. She ranked 31st in Eastern Eyes "Top 50 Asian Stars" of 2022 List.

Dilaik has been supporting LGBTQ community since her portrayal of a transgender in Shakti - Astitva Ke Ehsaas Ki. Her Bigg Boss 14s winning gown and other gowns she wore on the show were sold for charity to support the LGBTQIA+ community, in commemoration of Pride Month in June 2021.

Filmography

Films

Television

Special appearances

Web series

Music videos

Accolades

See also
List of Indian television actresses
List of Hindi television actresses
List of Hindi film actresses

References

External links
 
 

Living people
Indian television actresses
1987 births
People from Shimla
Actresses from Himachal Pradesh
Actresses in Hindi television
21st-century Indian actresses
Indian soap opera actresses
Bigg Boss (Hindi TV series) contestants
Big Brother (franchise) winners
Fear Factor: Khatron Ke Khiladi participants